Prairie Creek is a census-designated place (CDP) in Benton County, Arkansas, United States. Per the 2020 census, the population was 2,217. It is a lakefront community adjacent to Beaver Lake and Rogers within the Northwest Arkansas region.

Geography
Prairie Creek is located at  (36.340915, -94.061603).

Demographics

2020 census

Note: the US Census treats Hispanic/Latino as an ethnic category. This table excludes Latinos from the racial categories and assigns them to a separate category. Hispanics/Latinos can be of any race.

2000 Census
As of the census of 2000, there were 1,849 people, 832 households, and 607 families residing in the CDP. The racial makeup of the CDP was 97.35% White, 0.16% Black or African American, 0.92% Native American, 0.22% Asian, 0.11% Pacific Islander, 0.22% from other races, and 1.03% from two or more races.  0.92% of the population were Hispanic or Latino of any race.

There were 832 households, out of which 18.4% had children under the age of 18 living with them, 67.2% were married couples living together, 3.1% had a female householder with no husband present, and 27.0% were non-families. 22.8% of all households were made up of individuals, and 10.3% had someone living alone who was 65 years of age or older.  The average household size was 2.22 and the average family size was 2.59.

In the CDP, the population was spread out, with 17.1% under the age of 18, 3.5% from 18 to 24, 20.3% from 25 to 44, 32.2% from 45 to 64, and 26.9% who were 65 years of age or older.  The median age was 51 years. For every 100 females, there were 94.6 males.  For every 100 females age 18 and over, there were 92.1 males.

The median income for a household in the CDP was $59,000, and the median income for a family was $61,709. Males had a median income of $52,969 versus $30,852 for females. The per capita income for the CDP was $37,355.  About 2.3% of families and 4.5% of the population were below the poverty line, including 8.1% of those under age 18 and 3.5% of those age 65 or over.

Human resources
Public education for early childhood, elementary and secondary school students is provided by Rogers School District.

The primary law enforcement agency in Prairie Creek is the Benton County Sheriff's Office. The Prairie Creek Substation opened on Highway 12 in 2017.

Culture

The community is home to the Prairie Creek Marina on Beaver Lake. The marina has over 500 boat slips.

Education
It is in the Rogers Public Schools school district.

References

Census-designated places in Benton County, Arkansas
Census-designated places in Arkansas
Northwest Arkansas